John Barnard (6 November 1681 – 24 January 1770) was a Congregationalist minister from Massachusetts.

Barnard attended Harvard where he received an MA and also read theology. In 1707 he became one of the chaplains in an expedition against Port Royal, Nova Scotia. This foray was commanded by Colonel John March. The siege, which was unsuccessful, appeared to have been the conclusion of his military career.

External links 
 
 

1681 births
1770 deaths
American Congregationalist ministers
People of colonial Massachusetts
Harvard University alumni